Felipe Delgado, born Felipe Delgado Martillo on July 14, 1973, is an Ecuadorian swimmer who is a competitor in 50m & 100m Freestyle.

At the 1995 Pan American Games in Mar del Plata, he finished 6th in the 50-metre freestyle, 7th in the 200-metre freestyle, and 8th in the 100-metre freestyle.

At the 1996 Summer Olympics in Atlanta, Delgado finished 25th in the 50-meter freestyle, 38th in the 100-meter freestyle, 40th in the 200-meter freestyle, and 15th in the 4x100-meter freestyle.

At the 2000 Summer Olympics in Sydney, Delgado finished 56th in the 100-meter freestyle.

References

1973 births
Living people
Ecuadorian male swimmers
Swimmers at the 1995 Pan American Games
Swimmers at the 1999 Pan American Games
Olympic swimmers of Ecuador
Swimmers at the 1996 Summer Olympics
Swimmers at the 2000 Summer Olympics
Pan American Games competitors for Ecuador
20th-century Ecuadorian people